Alfred Thaddeus Crane Pennyworth is a fictional character appearing in American comic books published by DC Comics, most commonly in association with the superhero Batman.

Pennyworth is depicted as Bruce Wayne's loyal and tireless butler, legal guardian, best friend, aide-de-camp, and surrogate father figure following the murders of Thomas and Martha Wayne. As a classically trained British Butler and an ex-Special Operations Executive operative of honor and ethics with connections within the intelligence community, he has been called "Batman's batman". He serves as Bruce's moral anchor while providing comic relief with his sarcastic and cynical attitude. A vital part of the Batman mythos, Alfred was nominated for the Wizard Fan Award for Favorite Supporting Male Character in 1994.

In non-comics media, the character has been portrayed in live-action and voiced by actors William Austin, Eric Wilton, Michael Gough, Michael Caine, Jeremy Irons, Douglas Hodge, and Andy Serkis on film, and by Alan Napier, Efrem Zimbalist Jr., Ian Abercrombie, David McCallum, and Sean Pertwee on television, among others. Ralph Fiennes provided the voice of Alfred in the animated Lego Movie franchise, and Martin Jarvis voiced the character in the Batman: Arkham video game series. A young version of Pertwee's Alfred, played by Jack Bannon, depicts him before he became the butler to the Wayne family in the television series Pennyworth.

Publication history
The character first appeared in Batman #16 (April 1943), by writer Don Cameron and artist Bob Kane. Evidence suggests that Alfred was created by the writers of the 1943 Batman serial—Victor McLeod, Leslie Swabacker, and Harry Fraser—and that DC Comics asked Don Cameron to write the first Alfred story, which was published prior to the serial's release.

Fictional character biography
In Alfred's first appearance, he was overweight and clean-shaven; however, when the 1943 Batman serial was released, William Austin, the actor who played Alfred, was trim and sported a thin moustache. DC editors wanted the comic Alfred to resemble his cinematic counterpart, so in Detective Comics #83 (January 1944), Alfred vacationed at a health resort, where he slimmed down and grew a mustache. This look has remained with the character ever since, even surviving his apparent "death" and resurrection.

Alfred was originally conceived as a comedic foil for Batman and Robin; he spoke with a Cockney accent, and simply arrived on Wayne Manor's doorstep to announce that he was beginning his duties. In most early tales, he made bungling attempts to be a detective on a par with the young masters. He was given a four-page feature of his own, "The Adventures of Alfred", in Batman #22 (April–May 1944) and the feature lasted 13 issues, skipping Batman #35, with the last story in Batman #36. The stories followed a simple formula, with Alfred solving a crime and catching the culprits entirely by accident. In later years, the comedic aspects of the character were downplayed.

Pre-Crisis
The Pre-Crisis comics (the comics that were published by DC Comics between 1938 and 1984) established Alfred as a retired actor and intelligence agent who followed the deathbed wish of his dying father (identified only as "Jarvis") to carry on the tradition of serving the Wayne family. To that end, Alfred introduced himself to Bruce Wayne and Dick Grayson at Wayne Manor and insisted on becoming their butler. Although the pair did not want one, especially since they did not want to jeopardize their secret identities with a servant in the house, they did not have the heart to reject Alfred. (The name "Pennyworth" was first used for Alfred in 1969 and thereafter it has been assumed that his father was named Jarvis Pennyworth; as it is customary for British domestic servants to be called by surname it might have been implied on Alfred's introduction that Jarvis was the surname he shared with his father; the surname "Beagle" was explicitly used for Alfred starting in 1945 and on the introduction of "Pennyworth" this is treated as having always been their name by retcon).

Initially, Alfred discovered their identities by accident; while fighting a burglar in Batman #16 (Alfred's first appearance), he accidentally hit a switch and opened a sliding panel leading to the Batcave. He is helpful to the duo, following them to a theatre where they are captured, bound, and gagged by a criminal gang, and rescues them after Batman attracts his attention by knocking a rope down before the crooks return. This was revised in Batman #110 (September 1957); during his first night at Wayne Manor, Alfred awoke to moaning and followed the sound to the secret passage to the staircase leading to the Batcave and met his would-be employers in their superhero identities with Batman wounded in the field. As it turned out, the wounds were actually insignificant, but Alfred's care convinced the residents that their butler could be trusted. Since then, Alfred cheerfully included the support staff duties of the Dynamic Duo on top of his regular tasks.

Ironically, Alfred's loyalty would lead him to become a member of Batman's rogue's gallery. While pushing Batman and Robin out of the way of a falling boulder, Alfred was seemingly killed in Detective Comics #328 (June 1964). It was revealed in Detective Comics #356 (October 1966) that he had been revived by a scientist named Brandon Crawford. His attempt at regeneration resulted in a dramatic change: Alfred awoke from his apparent death with pasty white skin with circular markings, superhuman powers, including telekinesis, and a desire to destroy Batman and Robin. Calling himself the Outsider, he indirectly battled the Dynamic Duo on a number of occasions, using others as his puppets—the Grasshopper Gang in Detective #334, Zatanna in Detective #336, and even the Batmobile itself in Detective #340—and generally only appeared as a mocking voice over the radio. He did not physically appear in the comics until Detective #356, when he is bathed again in the rays of the regeneration machine during a struggle with Batman, and returns to normal, with no memory of his time as a supervillain. His time as the Outsider is collected in Showcase Presents: Batman Volumes 1 and 2.

Alfred was later reunited with his long-lost daughter, Julia Remarque, though this element was not included in Post-Crisis comics. Her mother was the war heroine Mademoiselle Marie, whom Alfred had met while working as an intelligence agent in occupied France during World War II.

Post-Crisis and Zero Hour
In the Post-Crisis comics continuity, Alfred has been the Wayne family butler all of Bruce's life and had helped his master establish his superhero career from the beginning. In addition, he was Bruce's legal guardian and father figure following the murder of his parents. Alfred's history has been modified several times over the years, creating assorted versions. In one such version, Alfred was hired away from the British Royal Family by Bruce's parents, and he virtually raised Bruce after they were murdered.

Meanwhile, another version of Alfred's Post-Crisis life was slightly more closely linked to his Pre-Crisis counterpart. In this version, Alfred is an actor on the English stage who agrees to become the Waynes' butler to honor his father's dying wish that he continue the "family business" of serving the Waynes, his father having been butler for Bruce's grandparents. At the time he begins working for the Waynes, Bruce is a young child. After several months, Alfred voices the desire to quit and return home to continue his life as an actor. However, these plans are momentarily forgotten when young Bruce returns home after getting into a fight with a school bully. Alfred teaches Bruce to outsmart the bully, rather than using brute force. When Alfred's advice works, Bruce asks him to stay, and he agrees without a second thought. Shortly afterward, Bruce's parents are murdered, and Alfred steps in as the boy's legal guardian.

Alfred later helps Bruce raise his adopted wards Dick Grayson, Jason Todd, and Tim Drake, all of whom also become his crimefighting partner, Robin. He also has close friendships with other members of the Batman family, including Barbara Gordon and Cassandra Cain. Alfred often acts as a father-figure to Bruce, and a grandfather to Dick, Jason, and Tim. He is also highly respected by Batman's fellow superheroes, including Superman, Wonder Woman, Green Lantern, and the original Teen Titans.

Alfred has also been romantically linked to Dr. Leslie Thompkins, a Wayne family friend who is also aware of Bruce's secret identity. He ends the relationship after she apparently allows Stephanie Brown to die from neglect. He also develops feelings for Tim Drake's stepmother, but again, nothing comes of it.

In the Knightfall story arc, Alfred watches helplessly as Batman slowly crumbles under the pressure of fighting every escaped criminal in Arkham Asylum, who were set free by Bane. When Bane breaks Batman's back, Alfred tries to treat the injury, but Batman remains paraplegic and a wheelchair user. During the events of Knightquest, Alfred accompanies Bruce to England and becomes enraged when he insists on endangering his own health. This is the culmination of several weeks of Bruce's self-destructive behavior, and when Bruce returns to Gotham City, Alfred remains in England, tendering his resignation. He spends some time vacationing in Antarctica and the Bahamas before returning to England. Dick Grayson tracks him down several months later and convinces him to return to Wayne Manor. In that story, it is revealed he had walked out of his own wedding years earlier.

His resourcefulness comes to the fore in the No Man's Land storyline, especially in Legends of the Dark Knight #118. Batman goes missing for weeks, leaving Alfred alone to watch his city for him. He uses his skills as an actor, storyteller, medic, and spy to survive and collect information on the recently destroyed Gotham City. Alfred even uses hand-to-hand combat in a rare one-panel fight sequence between him and a pair of slavers that ends with his rescue by Batman.

In Batman #677, agents of Batman's mysterious enemy Black Glove attack and beat Alfred in front of Bruce and Jezebel Jet, severely injuring him. In the same issue, a reporter from The Gotham Gazette suggests to Commissioner Jim Gordon that Alfred may be Bruce's biological father and that this may be a reason for the murder of Bruce's mother Martha. Alfred later denies the entire story, agreeing with Bruce that it was a fabrication. In the Batman and the Outsiders Special, Alfred is seen apologizing at the graves of Thomas and Martha Wayne for Bruce's death, commenting that he grieves as a parent, regarding Bruce as his son. Later, a secret panel in Alfred's room opens, the result of a fail-safe planted by Bruce in the event of his death. Bruce leaves him one final task and also bids him an emotional goodbye, telling Alfred he considered him as a father.

Alfred is left emotionally shattered, commenting more than once that, even if his biological fatherhood is a fabrication, in a deeper sense he actually was Bruce Wayne's father, having watched over him for years and feeling he failed him in the last moments.

After the event of Final Crisis, when Batman is apparently killed in action, Alfred finds himself with the task of raising Bruce's biological son Damian with Grayson. Batman: Battle for the Cowl sees Alfred allowing Damian to take on his first mission as Robin, giving Damian a Robin tunic and calling on the Squire to assist the new Boy Wonder in finding Tim Drake, who went missing hunting down Jason Todd. Alfred also assists Grayson in his role as Gotham's new Dark Knight.

After discovering that the original Batman was actually lost in time after his battle with Darkseid, Alfred immediately seeks clues to his whereabouts. Eventually, Bruce finds his way to the present. After Batman successfully expands his mission globally with Batman Inc., Bruce assumes full responsibility as a father, and Alfred assists him in raising Damian.

The New 52

In The New 52, it is revealed that Alfred's father Jarvis Pennyworth was the butler of the Wayne family before Alfred when Bruce was a child. Jarvis was blackmailed by the Court of Owls to set a trap for the pregnant Martha Wayne. Despite declining, the Court managed to cause a car accident that caused the child to be born prematurely and eventually to have died. Jarvis attempted to resign from his services and write a letter to his son in which he describes the manor as a cursed place, and tells Alfred that he should not begin his service under the Wayne family. However, Jarvis was unable to send it as he was murdered that night.

During Batman: Eternal, Alfred is reunited with his long-absent daughter, Julia Pennyworth, an agent of the Special Reconnaissance Regiment, when Batman finds her in Hong Kong and takes her back to Wayne Manor for medical treatment after she is stabbed with a samurai sword through the chest by a Chinese gang boss she was hunting. Julia is initially hostile to Alfred, feeling that he has wasted his life going from a soldier to tending to a "fop" like Bruce Wayne. However, after Alfred is attacked by Hush and infected with a fear toxin, she discovers the Batcave and takes on her father's role to coordinate the Bat-Family's efforts against their foes. Alfred is briefly transferred to Arkham Asylum before it is attacked as part of the conspiracy, but he manages to survive the explosion and trick Bane into helping him reach an emergency cave Batman had installed under Arkham, the cave's defenses knocking Bane out and allowing Alfred to call for help.

When Hush was briefly kept prisoner in the Batcave, he managed to break out of his cell and lock Alfred in it before sabotaging the Batman Family's equipment via the Batcomputer as they fought various villains, including crashing the Batwing with Batman still in it. However, he was swiftly returned to captivity when Alfred escaped the cell and knocked Hush out, Alfred harshly informing Tommy that he was hardly going to be locked up in his own home.

During the Batman: Endgame arc, the Joker broke into the Batcave, and during a confrontation with Alfred, cut off Alfred's right hand. Julia confirms to Bruce later in the issue that Alfred survived the encounter and is in a stable condition. Following the death of Bruce Wayne, Julia says that with current medical technology, they can have Alfred's hand reattached without any complications. However Alfred refuses, stating that with Bruce dead, he no longer has need of it as he has no one left to serve.

Even with the loss of Bruce as Batman, Alfred still assists the Batman Family in the Batcave along with Julia. After Bruce is discovered to be alive but with no memory of who he is or of his life as Batman, Alfred tells Bruce everything that had happened in his life up to the point of the creation of Batman, but accepts Bruce's request not to learn any more. Alfred did this so that, after years of service to the people of Gotham and the world, Bruce could finally accept his reward of a life without pain and the burning desire to be Batman, allowing his life as Bruce Wayne to finally begin. However, when the new villain Mr. Bloom launches a mass attack that apparently kills Jim Gordon—the new Batman—the amnesic Bruce pieces together enough information to deduce that he was once Batman, and convinces Alfred to subject him to a machine that will theoretically download all of his memories as Batman into his mind.

Bruce's original plan was for the machine to be used to create a series of clones of himself that could be programmed to continue his mission, but although the process failed because simulations confirmed that the human mind could not handle Batman's trauma, Bruce comes through the process by having Alfred take him to the point of brain-death and then download his memories onto his blank brain. With his master restored, Alfred's hand is subsequently reattached, Bruce joking that they used a random hand from the reserves rather than keeping Alfred's hand on ice all this time.

DC Rebirth

Following the 2016 DC Rebirth continuity reboot, Alfred appears in Detective Comics and the third volume of Batman, as well as in All-Star Batman. In the latter, Alfred is among the many Gotham citizens blackmailed by Two-Face into stopping Batman from providing his former self, Harvey Dent, a cure for his split personality; Alfred in particular reluctantly shoots down the Batwing as Batman is flying it. When asked, Alfred reveals his secret; years earlier, he had hired a hit man to kill the Joker after the villain murdered Jason Todd and disabled Barbara Gordon. Alfred soon cancelled the hit, however, after realizing that committing cold-blooded murder would betray Batman's ideals.

In Batman #77 (part of the "City of Bane" storyline), an evil version of Thomas Wayne from an alternate dimension invades Gotham City and defeats Batman, and uses Alfred as a hostage to keep the rest of the Bat-Family out. At Thomas' behest, Bane breaks Alfred's neck, killing him after Robin sneaks into Gotham City to rescue him and defeat Bane. When Bruce comes back to Gotham, he is captured and shown Alfred's body, but a recorded message reveals that he arranged for his own death so that Bruce could come back and stop Thomas, the message reaffirming Alfred's faith in Bruce as the true Batman. In Nightwing #78, Barbara visits Dick Grayson and reveals that Alfred was a billionaire, due to stock from Wayne Industries after Alfred became Bruce's legal guardian. Barbara then tells Dick that Alfred has left his fortune to Dick in his will.

Characterization

Name
In 1945, Alfred's name was given officially as Alfred Beagle. This name was subsequently given to an alternative version of the character from the world of Earth-Two, and Pennyworth became Alfred's accepted surname in the mainstream continuity. Alfred has also used the alias "Thaddeus Crane", which is derived from his middle names. His full name of Alfred Thaddeus Crane Pennyworth was depicted on his tombstone in Superman/Batman: Generations. Grant Morrison's run has referred to the Beagle surname as a possible stage name.

Family
 Jarvis Pennyworth: Alfred's father in both Pre-Crisis and New 52 continuity. In the TV series, Pennyworth he is named Arthur instead.
 Mary Pennyworth: Alfred's mother in the TV series, Pennyworth.
 Wilfred Pennyworth: Alfred's brother, Wilfred is referenced in the late 1960s and early 1970s and is mentioned in the 1997 film Batman & Robin.
 Daphne Pennyworth: Alfred Pennyworth's niece, daughter of Wilfred Pennyworth, Daphne briefly appeared in the late 1960s/early 1970s.
 Mademoiselle Marie: A war heroine with whom Alfred (while working as an intelligence agent in France) has a daughter in Pre-Crisis continuity.
 Julia Remarque: Alfred's daughter by Mademoiselle Marie. Appears as Julia Pennyworth in New 52 continuity as well as on Batwoman.
 Margaret Wilson née Pennyworth: Alfred and Wilfred Pennyworth's sister in the 1997 film Batman & Robin.
 Barbara Wilson: Alfred's niece, daughter of Margaret Wilson née Pennyworth in the 1997 film Batman & Robin. In traditional comics, her name is Barbara Gordon and is the daughter of James Gordon, with no relation to Alfred other than her place as Batgirl.
 Theobald: Alfred's second cousin in Earth-One continuity.

Skills, resources, and abilities
A highly intelligent and resourceful man, Alfred runs the day-to-day operations of Wayne Manor and maintains much of the equipment of the Batcave beneath it. A former actor, he can use his acting and disguise skills to help Batman in the field when necessary, and is even capable of impersonating Bruce Wayne on the telephone convincingly, as well as giving Bruce various lessons that help him maintain his covers. He has also provided first aid up to and including suturing wounds and removing bullets, as well as occasional tactical support. He is also able to perform arthroscopy and other advanced medical procedures, thus limiting, if not eliminating, the need for hospital medical treatment even in the face of grievous injuries, helping to maintain Batman's secret identity by ensuring that Bruce Wayne has no need to visit hospitals for wounds inflicted on Batman. Nevertheless, Batman still requires professional medical treatment when Bane breaks his back (Batman: Knightfall) and Hush's machinations result in him sustaining a skull fracture (Batman: Hush). On these occasions, Alfred admits that his own skills are inadequate for such medical procedures.

While not as skilled at martial arts as Bruce Wayne, Alfred is still nearly as resourceful. In one story in which he is kidnapped, he readily escapes and overcomes his captors without disturbing the cut of his suit. It was later mentioned that he had been kidnapped unsuccessfully 27 times (these events take place in the Gotham Adventures comics, based on the animated adventures of Batman, and not within the standard DCU continuity). During Batman: The Resurrection of Ra's al Ghul, Ubu, Ra's al Ghul's musclebound bodyguard, attempts to use Alfred as a hostage, only to be disabled by a well timed sucker punch from Alfred.

Presumably due to his lack of superpowers, the advanced combat training Bruce's other associates have, and Alfred's age, Alfred is the only member of the "Batman Family" that Bruce does not mind using a firearm, in his case favoring a shotgun when dealing with direct attacks on his person.

Current issues of the various Batman comics seem to indicate that Alfred is a pioneer in and has also mastered several fields of rose breeding (even creating his own, the "Pennyworth Blue"), computer programming, electrical engineering, chemical engineering, mechanical engineering, nanotechnology, and biotechnology as he singlehandedly builds, programs, and maintains much of Batman's next-generational technology such as the Batcomputer.

Other versions

All Star Batman and Robin the Boy Wonder
In Frank Miller and Jim Lee's All Star Batman and Robin the Boy Wonder, Alfred is a tougher individual with a different backstory. Following Batman's assault on the corrupt Gotham City police, Alfred and Vicki Vale are caught in the devastating car wreckage Batman creates (not aware of their presence) and Vale is badly hurt. Alfred is seen, shirtless and muscled, applying a tourniquet and generally taking control of the situation. He is described as having been a Royal Air Force combat medic and as ex-British Secret Service.

Batman: The Dark Knight Returns
In Batman: The Dark Knight Returns, an elderly Alfred still acts as Bruce's butler, mourning Bruce's diminished social contacts while continuing to loyally serve his master even after Bruce becomes Batman once again after a ten-year retirement. At the story's conclusion, having set Wayne Manor to self-destruct to protect Bruce Wayne's full secrets after his faked death during his fight with Superman, Alfred dies of a stroke, his last thoughts being to consider how utterly proper it is that he should die as Wayne Manor ceases to exist.

In the sequel, Batman: The Dark Knight Strikes Again, the Batcave computer has been programmed with an artificial intelligence named and apparently patterned after Alfred, to the point that it refers to Bruce as "Sir".

Earth One

Alfred appears as a main character in Geoff Johns' and Gary Frank's Batman: Earth One. In this incarnation, Alfred was a member of the Royal Marines. Alfred met Thomas Wayne during a tour of duty in the Middle East and the two became good friends. During a battle, Alfred saved Thomas' life but lost his right leg in the process. It is also implied that both he and Thomas are keeping a traumatic secret. Discharged back to his home in London, Alfred received a gift from Thomas in the form of a very expensive prosthetic leg.

He later traveled to Gotham City to visit his friend and found himself arriving on the night of a campaign party for Thomas' bid at the mayoral office. Afraid for his friend after hearing of the death threats on his life, Alfred tried to talk Thomas out of going to the movies with his wife and son, but Thomas refused to allow threats to keep him from enjoying his weekly movie night with Martha and Bruce. Later that night, Alfred was called to the police station. Thomas and Martha had been killed by a mugger outside the theatre and Bruce had been orphaned. To Alfred's shock, he discovered that Thomas and Martha had named him Bruce's legal guardian some time ago. Unsure of himself, Alfred still made it his mission to look out for Bruce as he grew up. When Bruce took on his costumed persona of Batman and began his war on crime, Alfred reluctantly took on the role of confidant and advisor, often telling Bruce to simply carry a gun instead of a belt full of untested gadgets. Alfred later saved Bruce's life by shooting Mayor Oswald Cobblepot.

Though Alfred introduced himself to the eight-year-old Bruce as his butler, it is obvious he never serves as a manservant in the story otherwise as Bruce's guardian and mentor. However, he is recruited by Thomas as his family's head of security prior to Thomas and his wife's deaths. He is also a skilled martial artist, and trains Bruce the combat skills he would eventually utilize as Batman. He has a daughter living in Seoul, South Korea with her mother, where Alfred had previously worked at a security firm, implying Julia Remarque's existence in this continuity.

Elseworlds
 Alfred appears in the Elseworlds series Superman & Batman: Generations. He serves the Wayne family before dying in 1967, but his spirit remains around to give Bruce advice. In Generations 2, he makes his final appearance in 1975, when he convinces the ghost of Dick Grayson not to kill the Joker. He manages to convince Dick to pass over, but in the process his own soul crosses over, meaning he cannot come back.
 In Batman: Castle of the Bat, Alfred is reimagined as the hunchbacked Alfredo, the "Igor" to Doctor Bruce Wayne, whose experiments see him reviving his father's brain in the body of the giant "Bat-Man". In keeping with his role as "Igor", Alfredo is often forced to bear the brunt of his master's frustrations with the situation as the revived Thomas Wayne escapes to stalk highwaymen as the monstrous "Bat-Man".
 In Batman: Dark Allegiances, Alfred is still Bruce Wayne's butler as Bruce faces various fascist-themed versions of his rogues gallery, but after the government asks Bruce to become an official American agent during World War II, Alfred joins Bruce and Selina Kyle in the field as the new Robin. 
 In Batman: Dark Knight Dynasty, in a timeline where the Waynes were never killed, Alfred assists Bruce in investigating his parents' deaths when they apparently fall out of their penthouse (revealed to have been done due to the influence of Vandal Savage's henchwoman the Scarecrone when the Waynes threatened his plan to acquire the meteor that gave him his powers). While studying available information on the meteor, Alfred discovers a record of the unusual energy reading it emits, but triggers a booby-trap that destroys Wayne Manor and kills him. Five centuries later, Bruce's descendant Brenda Wayne discovers a fragmented recording of Alfred and the energy reading that assists her in her own investigations into Savage's activities.
 In League of Justice, where the Justice League exists in a world where magic is prominent, Alfred is reinvented as a zombie-like figure, reinforcing Bruce's idea that science is more reliable than magic despite its greater potential power.
 Alfred plays a prominent role in the "Vampire Batman" trilogy, in which Batman is turned into a vampire to fight Count Dracula, forging Batman's weapons to use against the remaining members of Dracula's "family" and subsequently working with Commissioner Gordon after Batman succumbs to his vampiric instincts and begins to kill his old enemies. At the conclusion of the trilogy, with Gordon being hunted by Two-Face and Killer Croc in the remains of the Batcave, Alfred sacrifices his life to allow the currently weakened Batman to drink his blood, giving his old master the strength to save Gordon and the people of Gotham one last time before he allows himself to die to end the threat that he has become.

Earth-3

During the "Trinity War" event of The New 52, it is revealed that the leader of the Secret Society is Alfred from Earth-3 who serves Owlman of the Crime Syndicate of America. Flashbacks reveal that Alfred helped Thomas Wayne Jr. kill his parents and brother when he was a child, Owlman reflecting that Alfred was the only member of his family that he could control.

Injustice tie-ins

Injustice: Gods Among Us
In the comic book tie-in series to the video game, Alfred remained loyal to Bruce even when Bruce began the Insurgency and opposed Superman and had his secret identity exposed. When Superman invades the Batcave and breaks Batman's back, Alfred ingests the 5-U-93-R pill (which gives a person superhuman strength and durability) and subdues Superman, breaking his nose and beating him down. Alfred takes Bruce to the Tower of Fate, where Zatanna and Doctor Fate are hiding and will heal Bruce. For over seven months, Alfred oversees Bruce's slow recovery. When the Insurgency began their attack on Superman's Regime, Alfred provided a kryptonite-tipped bullet to the Black Canary for her to face Superman.

In the following years, Alfred remained the caretaker of Wayne Manor despite Bruce's absence, and still maintained a close relationship with Damian Wayne despite Damian's earlier betrayal of his father and decision to join Superman. He is visited by Superman in Year Five, the Kryptonian wanting to know the ever-elusive Batman's location. Alfred, unaware where Batman is and not willing to help nonetheless, ignores Superman. He is eventually killed by Victor Zsasz, whom Superman sent to get information on Batman's location. His death pushes Batman out of hiding to confront Zsasz and Damian killing Zsasz out of revenge. In the game's sequel, Injustice 2, Zsasz is killed in Year One by Damian, leaving Alfred's death in the continuity unexplained, but his takedown of Superman is referenced by Harley Quinn.

Injustice 2
In the prequel comic to Injustice 2 Ra's enacts a plan to bring the world balance and has Damian kidnap Alfred's corpse and resurrects him through the Lazarus Pit to use as a hostage against Batman. Due to Alfred being dead for a long time, he is brought back in a zombie-like state and requires constant medical attention from Damian. Upon recovering, around the same time he witnessed Batman and Damian attempt to kill each other, a fully recovered Alfred stops them and lecture them that his death was neither Damian nor Bruce's faults, attempting to reconcile them. Unfortunately, when Jaime Reyes/the current Blue Beetle and El Diablo unintentionally destroys all supposed extinct animals, Alfred is now under the Insurgency's safety. Upon returning to Wayne Manor for his recovery, it is revealed that the side-effect of Alfred's resurrection somehow caused him to have completely forgotten about the previous casualties he remembered during Superman's downfall and the five year regime, such as Damian's accidental murder of Dick Grayson, only for Batman to remind him about this. Alfred eventually leaves Bruce and Wayne Manor as he has felt incomplete since his resurrection.

Tangent Comics
Alfred makes a very brief appearance in the 1997 Tangent Comics one-shot issue Green Lantern in a story revolving around the Tangent versions of King Faraday and Roy Raymond. In this version, Alfred Pennyworth is the head of a publishing empire that owned "the House Of Mystery".

Tiny Titans
Alfred appears in Tiny Titans, and often has to make Robin stand in the corner because he has misbehaved.

Batman: The Murder Machine
In an alternate reality depicted in the Metals crossover, Alfred is killed by Bane, prompting Bruce to request Cyborg's help in completing 'the Alfred Protocol', an artificial intelligence version of Alfred, created to allow Batman to keep some aspect of his 'father' with him. Once the Alfred Protocol is completed, its fixation on protecting its 'son' results in the A.I. version of Alfred murdering all of Batman's rogues gallery, permanently merging with his 'son' as part of this goal.

The Batman Who Laughs
The Batman Who Laughs - a monstrous version of Batman contaminated by the same chemicals that drove the Joker insane - claims that Alfred is the only member of his old family he left alive back on his world. The villain claims that he drove his own version of Alfred insane by implying that his original self is still "alive" within him until Alfred chose to serve the Batman Who Laughs on his own, but the "prime" Alfred denies that any version of him could do this.

Nightwing: The New Order
In this alternate reality, Nightwing ends an ongoing feud between superpowered beings by activating a device that de-powers 90 percent of the super powered population. This builds to a future where superpowers are outlawed and any superpowered being must take inhibitor medications or be imprisoned. When Bruce is killed during the feud, Alfred inherits his estate and moves to Arizona, while allowing Dick Grayson and his son Jake to stay in Wayne Manor. Though Alfred does not approve of Grayson's crusade against superhumans after Bruce's death, he still occasionally visits him. When Grayson discovered that Jake is beginning to develop powers, his house is invaded by his own police force, the Crusaders, to take Jake away. Alfred attempts to strike one of the Crusaders, who then shoots him dead.

Collected editions

In other media

Television

Live-action

 Alfred appeared in the 1960s Batman series, portrayed by Alan Napier. No surname was given for this version, as "Pennyworth" was not introduced in the comics until after the series had ended production. 
 Alfred appeared in Birds of Prey, portrayed by Ian Abercrombie. Abercrombie had previously portrayed the character in a 1997 television commercial promoting the home media release of the film Batman & Robin.
 A younger version of Alfred appears in the Batman prequel series Gotham, portrayed by Sean Pertwee.
 An even younger version of the character appears in the series Pennyworth, portrayed by Jack Bannon. This series serves as an origin story for the Alfred seen in Gotham during his younger days and explores his past as a soldier in the SAS.
 Alfred is featured in Titans. In "Hawk and Dove", Dick calls up Alfred (voiced by an uncredited actor) where he asks him for a favor by locating Hawk and Dove. In the episode "Dick Grayson", a dark future that Trigon subjected Dick to that in which Batman killed most of his enemies features a mentioning of Alfred being dead. It the episode "Barbara Gordon", it is revealed that Alfred has died sometime before the start of the third season.

Animation
 Alfred appeared in The Batman/Superman Hour, voiced by Olan Soule.
 Alfred appeared in Challenge of the Super Friends, voiced by William Callaway. In the episode "Wanted: The Superfriends", he is among several male humans who get turned into a Bizarro.
 Alfred appeared in The Super Powers Team: Galactic Guardians, voiced by Andre Stojka.
 Alfred appears in television series set in the DC Animated Universe. In the first three produced episodes for Batman: The Animated Series he is voiced by Clive Revill (before leaving due to a previous commitment) and by Efrem Zimbalist Jr. throughout the rest of the series as well as the subsequent shows The New Batman Adventures, Superman: The Animated Series, Static Shock, and Justice League). In Batman Beyond, Bruce Wayne confirms to Terry McGinnis that Alfred died sometime before 2019.
 Alfred appears in The Batman, voiced by Alastair Duncan.
 Alfred appears in Batman: The Brave and the Bold, voiced by James Garrett. He makes non-speaking cameos in the episodes "Invasion of the Secret Santas!" and "Chill of the Night!" before making a speaking appearance in the episode "The Knights of Tomorrow!" where he wrote the events of the episode in the titular book.
 The episode "The Super-Batman of Planet X!" features a robot inspired by Alfred named Alpha-Red (voiced by James Arnold Taylor) who serves as the robotic butler of Batman of Zur-En-Arrh.
 Alfred appears in the Young Justice episode "Downtime", voiced by Jeff Bennett.
 Alfred appears as a main character in Beware the Batman, voiced by JB Blanc.
 Alfred appears in the short film Lego DC Comics: Batman Be-Leaguered, voiced by Nolan North.
 Alfred makes several non-speaking appearances in Teen Titans Go!. He had his first speaking role in "Manors and Mannerisms", voiced by Fred Tatasciore.
 Alfred appears in the Scooby-Doo and Guess Who? episode "What a Night for a Dark Knight!", voiced by Steven Weber. This version is Daphne Blake's "uncle" and family friend of her father who gets kidnapped by Man-Bat. Mystery Inc. had to team up with Batman to rescue him. While Kirk Langstrom was revealed to be locked up in Arkham Asylum, it was discovered that Man-Bat was actually Joker in disguise who kidnapped Alfred as part of a plot to hack into Bruce Wayne's account. After Joker is handed over to the police, Alfred makes dinner for Mystery Inc. while commenting that he wished Bruce Wayne was there to meet them.
 Alfred appears in Harley Quinn, voiced by Tom Hollander. Introduced in the episode "Batman's Back Man", he attends to a recovering Bruce Wayne after he was gravely injured in the season one finale and forbids him from picking up the cowl again until he fully heals. To combat crime in the meantime, Alfred adopts a vigilante persona of his own called the Macaroni, using a wig equipped with various gadgets. Following this, Alfred makes minor appearances in subsequent episodes.
 Alfred appears in DC Super Hero Girls, voiced again by Keith Ferguson. He first appeared in the two-part episode, "#SoulSisters", as part of the title card for the show-within-a-show Make It Wayne. He makes his first physical appearance in the episode "TweenTitans", wherein he invites Jessica Cruz and Karen Beecher to watch over Dick Grayson and the Tween Titans on the former's birthday while Bruce Wayne is out for the day.

Film

Live-action

 Alfred appeared in the 1943 serial Batman, portrayed by William Austin, whose appearance influenced the change of Alfred's design from the original fat, clean shaven Alfred.
 Alfred appeared in the 1949 serial Batman and Robin, portrayed by Eric Wilton.
 Alfred appeared in the 1966 Batman film based on the 1960s TV series of the same name, with Alan Napier reprising his role from said series.
 Alfred appears in the Tim Burton/Joel Schumacher Batman film series, portrayed by Michael Gough. In the films, he is shown to be a tireless and faithful butler to Bruce Wayne (portrayed throughout the series by Michael Keaton, Val Kilmer, and George Clooney) and Dick Grayson (Chris O'Donnell), who has been serving the Wayne family since Bruce was a child. Despite his being displeased with Bruce's lack of a social life, Alfred nonetheless supports him in his activities as the vigilante Batman and serves as his assistant, as well as his sarcastic foil. In the fourth film, Batman & Robin, he falls ill with a mysterious disease called McGreggor Syndrome; in the end, however, he is cured by an antidote developed by Mr. Freeze (Arnold Schwarzenegger). Also in this film, he is revealed to be the uncle of Barbara Wilson (Alicia Silverstone), who later becomes Batgirl.
 Gough also portrayed Alfred in a 1989 Diet Coke commercial, in the BBC radio-drama presentation of the "Knightfall" story arc from the Batman comics, and in a series of OnStar commercials featuring Batman. In flashbacks depicted in Batman & Robin, Jon Simmons portrays a young Alfred.
 Alfred appears in Christopher Nolan's The Dark Knight Trilogy, portrayed by Michael Caine. This version's full name is Alfred J. Pennyworth and he is a former senior NCO in the elite SAS of the British Army and a veteran of tours of duty in Malaya, Cyprus, Borneo, Aden, West Germany, and twice in Northern Ireland.
 In Batman Begins, he becomes Bruce Wayne's (Christian Bale) legal guardian after Thomas and Martha Wayne are murdered by Joe Chill (Richard Brake). When Bruce vanishes for seven years, Wayne Enterprises' CEO William Earle (Rutger Hauer) declares him dead to take over the company, but is thwarted because Bruce left everything to Alfred. After Bruce returns from training with the League of Shadows, Alfred learns of Bruce's goal to become the vigilante Batman to fight the criminals of Gotham City, and encourages him to project a playboy image to deflect suspicion. When the League of Shadows, led by Ra's al Ghul (Liam Neeson), destroys Wayne Manor, Alfred saves Bruce's life and rallies him to save Gotham City.
 In The Dark Knight, Alfred and Bruce have moved to a downtown penthouse while Wayne Manor is being rebuilt. When the Joker (Heath Ledger) begins killing people to force Batman to reveal his true identity, Alfred entreats Bruce to keep fighting and accept the price of being Batman. Bruce's love interest Rachel Dawes (Maggie Gyllenhaal) gives Alfred the task of giving Bruce a letter "when the time is right". After Rachel is killed and her boyfriend, Gotham District Attorney Harvey Dent (Aaron Eckhart), is disfigured and becomes the criminal Two-Face, Alfred reads the letter and discovers that Rachel planned to marry Dent. He later burns the letter, reflecting that, just as the people of Gotham would need to believe in Dent, Bruce needed to believe that Rachel loved him.
 In The Dark Knight Rises, set eight years later, Alfred continues to serve Bruce, who has become a recluse since Rachel's death. He also reveals that during Bruce's absence, he frequently visited a restaurant in Florence, Italy with the fantasy that he would one day see Bruce there, settled down and happy. Alfred reluctantly assists Bruce in uncovering information on the mercenary Bane (Tom Hardy) and stands by as Bruce resumes his career as Batman. Following Batman's first encounter with Bane, Alfred fears that Bruce will get himself killed, and resigns to dissuade him; when Bruce protests, Alfred reveals the truth about Rachel. Angry and hurt, Bruce orders Alfred to leave. After Batman apparently sacrifices his life to save Gotham, Alfred tearfully apologizes at Thomas and Martha Wayne's graves for failing to save their son. When Alfred returns to the Florentine restaurant, however, he sees Bruce alive and in a relationship with Selina Kyle (Anne Hathaway), and they exchange knowing smiles before Alfred leaves, happy that Bruce has finally moved on with his life.
 Alfred appears in films set in the DC Extended Universe, portrayed by Jeremy Irons.
 First appearing in Batman v Superman: Dawn of Justice, Alfred worries about the effect Bruce Wayne's (Ben Affleck) crusade as Batman has on him, and attempts to serve as a humanizing influence when Bruce goes on a crusade to kill Superman (Henry Cavill). After Bruce accepts Superman as an ally and realizes that Lex Luthor (Jesse Eisenberg) had manipulated them both, Alfred assists Bruce in rescuing Martha Kent (Diane Lane).
 In Justice League, Alfred helps Bruce find the Flash (Ezra Miller), Wonder Woman (Gal Gadot), Cyborg (Ray Fisher), and Aquaman (Jason Momoa) and provides assistance to them as they face Steppenwolf (Ciarán Hinds) and his Parademon army. Following Steppenwolf's defeat, Alfred, Bruce, and Diana begin plans to reconstruct Wayne Manor into the Justice League's headquarters.
 Alfred appears in Joker, portrayed by Douglas Hodge. He tries to protect the young Bruce from mentally ill loner Arthur Fleck (Joaquin Phoenix), who believes that Thomas Wayne (Brett Cullen) is his biological father and, thus, that and he Bruce are half-brothers.
 Andy Serkis portrays Alfred in The Batman. In this film, Bruce (Robert Pattinson) and Alfred have a hostile relationship and rarely speak. Alfred is later hospitalized after opening a letter bomb addressed to Bruce. When Bruce learns about his father's connections to crime boss Carmine Falcone (John Turturro) and the murder of a journalist, he confronts Alfred, who confirms the allegations but maintains that Thomas only asked Falcone to threaten the journalist into silence, and planned to turn himself and Falcone over to the police once he found out the journalist was murdered. Alfred believes that Falcone had Thomas and Martha killed to prevent this. With Bruce fearing the loss of another person he cares about, the two reconcile.

Animation

 Efrem Zimbalist Jr. voiced Alfred in the DC Animated Universe films Batman: Mask of the Phantasm, Batman & Mr. Freeze: SubZero and Batman: Mystery of the Batwoman.
 Alastair Duncan voiced Alfred in The Batman vs. Dracula, Batman Unlimited: Animal Instincts, Batman Unlimited: Monster Mayhem, and Batman Unlimited: Mechs vs. Mutants.
 David McCallum voiced Alfred in Batman: Gotham Knight, Son of Batman, and Batman vs. Robin.
 Alan Oppenheimer voiced Alfred in Superman/Batman: Public Enemies.
 Jim Piddock voiced Alfred in the animated film Batman: Under the Red Hood.
 Jeff Bennett reprises his role as Alfred in Batman: Year One.
 Robin Atkin Downes voiced Alfred in Justice League: Doom.
 Michael Jackson voiced Alfred in Batman: The Dark Knight Returns.
 Alfred makes a non-speaking cameo appearance in Lego Batman: The Movie - DC Super Heroes Unite, an adaptation of the video game of the same name.
 Martin Jarvis reprises his role as Alfred from the Batman: Arkham video games in Batman: Assault on Arkham.
 James Garrett reprises his role as Alfred in Batman: Bad Blood.
 Brian George voiced Alfred in Batman: The Killing Joke and Batman vs. Teenage Mutant Ninja Turtles.
 Steven Weber voiced Alfred in Batman: Return of the Caped Crusaders and Batman vs. Two-Face.
 Ralph Fiennes voiced Alfred in the animated movie The Lego Batman Movie and The Lego Movie 2: The Second Part.
 Frogman voiced Alfred in DC Super Heroes vs. Eagle Talon.
 Anthony Head voiced Alfred in Batman: Gotham by Gaslight.
 Hōchū Ōtsuka and Adam Croasdell voiced Alfred in the Japanese and English version of Batman Ninja respectively.
 Alfred makes a non-speaking appearance in Teen Titans Go! To the Movies.
 Alfred makes a non-speaking cameo appearance in The Death of Superman.
 Alfred appears in the animated film adaptation of Batman: The Long Halloween, voiced again by Alastair Duncan.

Video games
 A character based on Alfred Pennyworth called Alfred Copperworth appears as an Easter egg in World of Warcraft: Wrath of the Lich King.
 A character based on Alfred called Aloysius Pennyworth appears in the 2014 Danganronpa video game Danganronpa Another Episode: Ultra Despair Girls and its 2016 prequel Danganronpa Togami 2: Hope's Peak Academy vs. Ultimate Despair as a supporting character, depicted as Byakuya Togami's butler.
 Alfred appears in the Batman Begins film tie-in game, with Michael Caine reprising his role from the film.
 Alfred appears as the narrator of Scribblenauts Unmasked: A DC Comics Adventure, voiced by Jim Piddock.
 Alfred appears as a supporting character in Gotham Knights, voiced by Gildart Jackson. He provides technical assistance and moral support to the Gotham Knights—Barbara Gordon, Dick Grayson, Jason Todd, and Tim Drake—after Batman's death, becoming a surrogate father figure to them, much like he did to Bruce after his parents' death.

Lego series
 Alfred appears as a playable character in Lego Batman for the PlayStation 3, Xbox 360, Nintendo DS and Wii, with his vocal effects provided by Keith Ferguson. Additionally, he can be sometimes seen walking around the Batcave.
 Alfred appears as a playable character in Lego Batman 2: DC Super Heroes, voiced by Steven Blum.
 Alfred appears as a playable character in Lego Batman 3: Beyond Gotham, voiced by Robin Atkin Downes. Another version of the character based on his appearance in the 1960s Batman TV series can be unlocked by completing the "Same Bat Time, Same Bat Channel" level.
 Alfred appears in Lego Dimensions, voiced again by Robin Atkin Downes.
 Alfred makes a non-playable appearance in Lego DC Super-Villains. The version of Alfred seen the start of The Lego Movie 2 was later added as a playable character via a DLC pack.

Arkham series
Alfred Pennyworth is a supporting character in the Batman: Arkham franchise, voiced by Martin Jarvis in the main series and Hugh Fraser in the VR game.

 While Alfred does not appear in the first installment, Batman: Arkham Asylum, the player can unlock his biography.
 Alfred has a voice-only role in Batman: Arkham City, remaining in constant radio contact with Batman and Oracle as the former investigates the eponymous Arkham City.
 Alfred makes his first physical appearance in the prequel game Batman: Arkham Origins. Throughout the game, he disapproves of Batman's techniques, to which Batman responds by holding his butler at a distance and taking advantage of him. When hired assassins target Batman, Alfred pleads the latter to abandon his vigilante persona, but his words fall on deaf ears. Having deduced Batman's secret identity, Bane later attacks Wayne Manor and beats Alfred to near-death so Batman can watch him die. Refusing to accept this, the Dark Knight uses the Electrocutioner's gauntlets to revive Alfred. This event leaves Batman shaken and on the verge of quitting, but Alfred, his understanding of Batman renewed, convinces him to keep fighting.
 In Batman: Arkham Knight, Alfred contacts Batman through a holographic projector throughout the game to give him valuable information. After Batman's secret identity is revealed to the world, Alfred assists him in enacting the "Knightfall Protocol" before they are both apparently killed in a large explosion at Wayne Manor.
 In Batman: Arkham VR, Alfred attempts to wake up Bruce while the latter suffers a nightmare due to the Joker's poisoned blood in his system.

Telltale's Batman
Alfred Pennyworth appears in both Batman: The Telltale Series and its sequel Batman: The Enemy Within, voiced by Enn Reitel.

 In the first game, like most interpretations, Alfred is Bruce's close friend and guardian. However, after Thomas Wayne's ties to corruption are revealed, their friendship is fractured when Bruce learns Alfred knew of Thomas' crimes, but never told him. Despite this, Alfred continues to support Bruce in the field and helps him in his battle against the Children of Arkham. Alfred is later kidnapped and tortured by the group and their leader, Lady Arkham, as part of retribution against the Wayne family, though he leaves clues for Bruce to find him and is rescued during Batman's final confrontation with Lady Arkham. Alfred may also lose an eye if the player chooses to have Batman attack Lady Arkham rather than unmask himself to protect Alfred.
 In the second game, Alfred continues to support Bruce, despite developing post-traumatic stress disorder following his kidnapping and torture. Due to the death of Lucius Fox, he becomes Bruce's closest ally, but suggests bringing another person onto the team. After falling unconscious however, Alfred decides to step away from helping Bruce as a vigilante, leading to him realizing that Bruce is going down the same self-destructive path as his father. Depending on whether Bruce decides to retire as Batman or continue his war on crime, Alfred will either stay with him or return to Great Britain.

Miscellaneous
 Alfred Pennyworth appears in the Smallville Season 11 digital comic based on the TV series of the same name.
 Alfred Pennyworth appears in the musical Holy Musical B@man! by StarKid Productions, portrayed by Chris Allen.

References

Plot summary citations

External links
 Alfred Pennyworth at DC Comics' official website
 Alfred Pennyworth on IMDb
 

Characters created by Bob Kane
Characters created by Jerry Robinson
Comics characters introduced in 1943
DC Comics martial artists
DC Comics military personnel
Fictional actors
Fictional British Army officers
Fictional British secret agents
Fictional bodyguards
Fictional butlers
Fictional Central Intelligence Agency personnel
Fictional chauffeurs
Fictional diarists
Fictional secretaries
Fictional immigrants to the United States
Fictional majors
Fictional mechanics
Fictional people from London
Fictional Royal Air Force personnel
Fictional Royal Marines personnel
Fictional Special Air Service personnel
Fictional security guards
Fictional valets
DC Comics male characters
Batman characters
Fictional murdered people